Megat Dewa is a small town in Kubang Pasu District, Kedah, Malaysia.

Kubang Pasu District
Towns in Kedah